Courts Island is a dolerite island with an area of 15.83 ha in south-eastern Australia.  It is part of the Actaeon Island Group, lying close to the south-eastern coast of Tasmania, at the southern entrance to the D'Entrecasteaux Channel between Bruny Island and the mainland.  It is connected to Bruny Island by a spit at low tide, and is part of South Bruny National Park.

Fauna
Recorded breeding seabird species are the little penguin, short-tailed shearwater and sooty shearwater. Feral cats are present.

References

Islands of Tasmania
Protected areas of Tasmania
South Bruny National Park